Wild World (stylised as "WILD WORLD") is the second studio album by English indie pop band Bastille, released on 9 September 2016 by Virgin EMI Records. The album was co-produced by Mark Crew. The lead single, "Good Grief", was released on 16 June 2016. The song "Send Them Off!" is featured on the soundtrack of the game FIFA 17. The cover photograph was taken at 30 Park Place in Downtown, New York City.

Critical reception

Wild World received generally positive reviews, with Caroline Sullivan of The Guardian giving the album four out of five stars. On Metacritic, the album received a score of 73 out of 100, based on ten critics—which Metacritic classes as "generally favorable".

Accolades

Track listing
On 15 August 2016, Bastille used Snapchat to reveal the track names of the 19 tracks on the Complete Edition via Snapchat geofilters planted at significant sites around the globe.

All songs were written by Dan Smith and produced by Smith and Mark Crew.

Personnel
Dan Smith – lead vocals, keyboards, piano, percussion, string arrangements, production, programming
Kyle Simmons – keyboards
Will Farquarson – bass guitar, acoustic guitar, electric guitar
Chris "Woody" Wood – drums, percussion on "Glory" and "Send Them Off!"
Tinashe Fazakerley – additional backing vocals
Rory Graham – additional backing vocals

Charts

Weekly charts

Year-end charts

Certifications

References

2016 albums
Bastille (band) albums
Virgin EMI Records albums
Virgin Records albums